The second season of the American animated television series Star Trek: Lower Decks follows the various missions and adventures of the "lower deckers" (low-ranking officers with menial jobs) on the USS Cerritos, one of Starfleet's least important starships. The season was produced by CBS Eye Animation Productions in association with Secret Hideout, Important Science, Roddenberry Entertainment, and animation studio Titmouse, with Mike McMahan serving as showrunner and Barry J. Kelly as supervising director.

Tawny Newsome, Jack Quaid, Noël Wells, and Eugene Cordero voice the lower decks crew members of the Cerritos, with Dawnn Lewis, Jerry O'Connell, Fred Tatasciore, and Gillian Vigman providing voices for the ship's senior officers. Lower Decks was ordered for two seasons in October 2018 with McMahan on board as showrunner. Production took place remotely due to the COVID-19 pandemic and some of the season's writers did not meet in person while working on it. The season continues some overarching storylines from the first season, such as the threat of the Pakleds and the relationship between Beckett Mariner (Newsome) and her mother, Captain Carol Freeman (Lewis). Titmouse began work in August 2020. The season features many connections and references to past Star Trek series such as Star Trek: The Next Generation, including several actors returning as guest stars.

The season premiered on the streaming service Paramount+ on August 12, 2021, and ran for 10 episodes until October 14. It has received several accolades, including a Hugo Award nomination. A third season was ordered in April 2021.

Episodes

Cast and characters

Main
 Tawny Newsome as Beckett Mariner
 Jack Quaid as Brad Boimler
 Noël Wells as D'Vana Tendi
 Eugene Cordero as Sam Rutherford
 Dawnn Lewis as Carol Freeman
 Jerry O'Connell as Jack Ransom
 Fred Tatasciore as Shaxs
 Gillian Vigman as T'Ana

Recurring
 Phil LaMarr as Admiral Freeman
 Lauren Lapkus as Jennifer Sh'reyan
 Jessica McKenna as Barnes
 Ben Rodgers as Steve Stevens
 Rich Fulcher as the Pakleds
 Carl Tart as Kayshon
 Paul Scheer as Andy Billups

Notable guests
 Jonathan Frakes as William Riker
 Marcus Henderson as Jet Manhaver
 Paul F. Tompkins as Migleemo
 Robert Duncan McNeill as Tom Paris
 Jeffrey Combs as AGIMUS
 Alice Krige as the Borg Queen
 Lycia Naff as Sonya Gomez

Production

Development

CBS All Access officially ordered two seasons of Star Trek: Lower Decks in October 2018. Mike McMahan was set as showrunner for the series. By late March 2020, work on the series was taking place remotely due to the COVID-19 pandemic forcing staff to work from home. Executive producer Alex Kurtzman said in August that work on the season was "barreling ahead, full steam ahead", and was not delayed by the pandemic like the live-action Star Trek series were. A month later, ViacomCBS announced that CBS All Access would be expanded and rebranded as Paramount+ in March 2021. The third episode of the season, "We'll Always Have Tom Paris", is the 800th Star Trek episode produced for television.

Writing
Writing on the second season began by March 2020, and was completed by mid-September. Due to the pandemic, the whole season was written remotely using Zoom and some new writers did not meet the others in person while working on the season. It was written knowing that fans would be able to stream the first two seasons back-to-back; McMahan wanted to carry the energy of the first season's final three episodes into the start of the second season, feeling that those episodes were when the writing team fully "figur[ed] out what the show was". Because the second season was mostly written before the first was released, the writers were not able to take fan responses into account and had to trust that the first season would be received positively.

McMahan said the second season would combine standalone episodes with season-long character arcs, and would take inspiration from the storytelling of Star Trek: Voyager and Star Trek: Deep Space Nine in addition to that of Star Trek: The Next Generation. He noted that many members of the crew had seen all of the previous Star Trek series, but they revisited specific episodes together such as the Star Trek: The Original Series episode "A Private Little War" which introduced the alien Mugatos. Writer Ben Rodgers "could not get over" the inconsistent pronunciation of "Mugato" in the episode, a production mistake that the Lower Decks team wanted to celebrate, so the episode "Mugato, Gumato" has a running joke about the different pronunciations. McMahan said the second season would not undo the end of the first, with Brad Boimler working on the USS Titan, which he compared to storylines on the science fiction series Farscape which took its characters away from the main starship. Other elements that were left for the second season include Sam Rutherford's memory issues, Mariner working with her mother Captain Freeman, and the Pakleds being a threat. McMahan wanted to address LGBTQ characters and relationships better than in the first season, especially by more explicitly depicting Mariner as bisexual.

The writers had a "distinct edict" from McMahan to elevate the characters Tendi and Rutherford during the second season so they were true co-leads of the series alongside Mariner and Boimler. He also wanted to play with the character combinations, such as telling a story with Mariner and Tendi together, as well as focus on the supporting characters for some episodes such as Dr. T'Ana and Chief Engineer Billups (the latter being a "secret sleeper favorite" character for the writers). Something McMahan was wary of was changing the main characters so much that they got too close to characters and storylines that previous Star Trek series had already covered. He hoped to show important changes in the main characters and develop them across the seasons without departing too much from the central premise of the series. An underlying theme for the season is the characters learning to trust each other, and it ends with Mariner successfully opening up to her mother. Freeman begins the season feeling that she should move up to "bigger and better places", but learns by the finale that she is in the right place on the Cerritos. That is another underlying theme for the season, which Freeman voices with the line "the carpets are greyer on the other side of the ship". Boimler has a similar journey in the season, wanting to be on the Titan but ending up happy to rejoin the Cerritos. Freeman's arc connects to the season-long Pakled story, which ends with her being arrested for apparently destroying the Pakled homeworld. This ends the season on a cliffhanger, setting up a new character arc for Mariner in the third season. Late in production on the finale, McMahan realized that this cliffhanger should include the "To Be Continued..." title card that previous Star Trek series used.

McMahan hoped to replicate the success of the first season's last three episodes by again having a sketch comedy episode ("I, Excretus"), a penultimate episode that breaks form for the series ("wej Duj"), and a big finale ("First First Contact"). The idea of "wej Duj", which means "Three Ships" in the Klingon language, came from the writers wanting to do something that had not been seen before and being surprised to learn that no previous series had told a contained story on a Vulcan ship. The episode shows "more lower decks than ever before" by exploring lower deckers on the Cerritos, a Vulcan ship, and a Klingon ship, which McMahan said was the kind of story he would pitch if given the opportunity to make a Star Trek film. He described the episode as a "triple-mini-movie that's part [Star Trek VI: The Undiscovered Country (1991)], part this Vulcan thing we've never seen before, and" also ties-into the season-long Pakled storyline. One element that he was not able to include, due to logistics, was having the full opening credits written in alternating Vulcan and Klingon text, but he was able to have the episode title shown in Klingon characters which is the first time a Star Trek episode title is not shown in English letters. For the finale, McMahan wanted a big moment that did not involve crashing the ship since that had already been done many times before in the franchise. Instead, for the first time in Star Trek, the hull plating is stripped from the whole ship. This was inspired by debris getting stuck in the hull of the USS Enterprise in the Star Trek: Enterprise episode "Minefield". The finale also introduces Cetacean Ops, an area of the starship for water-based crewmembers. It was first mentioned in The Next Generation but was never shown due to budgetary and logistical limitations. McMahan said it was a dream come true to finally see Cetacean Ops.

Casting and voice recording

The series stars a group of ensigns serving in the "lower decks" of the Cerritos—Tawny Newsome as Beckett Mariner, Jack Quaid as Brad Boimler, Noël Wells as D'Vana Tendi, and Eugene Cordero as Sam Rutherford—and the ship's bridge crew who believe "the show is about them, but it's not"—Dawnn Lewis as Captain Carol Freeman, Jerry O'Connell as first officer Commander Jack Ransom, Fred Tatasciore as security chief Lieutenant Shaxs, and Gillian Vigman as chief medical officer Dr. T'Ana. After Shaxs died in the first-season finale, the second season introduces a new security chief, Kayshon (voiced by comedian Carl Tart), but Shaxs soon returns in a storyline that plays on the numerous times that characters have been resurrected in Star Trek.

After the end of the first season, McMahan confirmed that Jonathan Frakes would return as his Next Generation character William Riker in the second season after guest starring in the first-season finale. Marina Sirtis also reprised her Next Generation role of Deanna Troi in the first-season finale, but did not return for the second season because "the stories didn't go that way" according to McMahan. He added that there would be other characters in the season returning from previous Star Trek series, and said they would "come in a way that you don't expect". Robert Duncan McNeill, who portrayed Tom Paris in Voyager, voices a commemorative plate of Paris that talks to a hallucinating Boimler, while Alice Krige returns as the Borg Queen from the film Star Trek: First Contact (1996), and Lycia Naff reprises her Next Generation guest role of Sonya Gomez. McMahan brought back Naff to have a callback that was not to one of the major Next Generation characters, and because he considered her to be "one of the original lower deckers". Additionally, Jeffrey Combs—who previously portrayed multiple characters across the franchise—voices an evil computer named AGIMUS; the evil entity Armus from the Next Generation episode "Skin of Evil" briefly appears voiced by Tatasciore, taking over the character from original voice actor Ron Gans; and the character Thadiun Okona from the Next Generation episode "The Outrageous Okona" makes a non-speaking cameo appearance as the DJ at a Starfleet party.

Other first-season cast members who returned for the second include Phil LaMarr as Admiral Freeman, Mariner's father; Lauren Lapkus as Jennifer Sh'reyan, an Andorian ensign on the Cerritos; Jessica McKenna as Ensign Barnes as well as the Cerritos computer; writer Ben Rodgers as Lieutenant Steve Stevens; Rich Fulcher as many of the Pakleds, including the Pakled leader, King Pakled, and Emperor of the Pakleds; Marcus Henderson as Lieutenant Jet Manhaver; Paul F. Tompkins as Dr. Migleemo; and Paul Scheer as Chief Engineer Andy Billups.

Voice recording for the season primarily took place with the actors in their own homes due to the COVID-19 pandemic. Newsome used a recording studio she already had at her house, and recording equipment was set up in the houses of other actors. However, Combs recorded his lines for the season in a traditional recording studio under pandemic precautions.

Animation and design
Independent animation studio Titmouse provides the animation for the series, with first-season episodic director Barry J. Kelly taking over from Juno Lee as supervising director for the second season. Work on the season's storyboards began in August 2020. These were put together as animatics for the animators to use as a basis for the final animation with full details and colors. The season's animation was in the final color phase by May 2021. The series' animation style reflects the look of "prime time animated comedy" series such as The Simpsons, but with more detailed backgrounds and environments than is traditional for prime time animation.

The model for the USS Cerritos features some "minor cosmetic changes" following the battle damage it received during the first-season finale. In "Strange Energies", the USS MacDuff appears in a holodeck program and is a Miranda-class ship like the USS Reliant from the film Star Trek II: The Wrath of Khan (1982), McMahan's favorite Star Trek starship and the inspiration for the Cerritos design. The two other main ships in "wej Duj" are the IKS Che'Ta, a Klingon Bird of Prey like those seen throughout the franchise, and the Vulcan cruiser Sh'Vhal which has a similar design to the Vulcan ships seen in Star Trek: Enterprise. The season finale introduces the USS Archimedes, an Obena-class starship inspired by the Excelsior-class from Star Trek III: The Search for Spock (1984) but bigger and with some small design changes. The new class was named for Nollan Obena, the series' art director who designed many of its starships. Also seen in the season is Starbase 25, which was mentioned in Star Trek: The Animated Series but not seen on screen until "An Embarrassment of Dooplers". The design closely resembles that of Starbase Vanguard from the Star Trek: Vanguard book series. Inside the Starbase is a Quark's Bar like the one seen in Deep Space Nine, which has become a franchise since the events of that series—Quark's Bars also appear on other planets in Lower Decks. Tendi gives Rutherford a model of Deep Space 9 in "An Embarrassment of Dooplers" that comes in a box with the same typography as the Deep Space Nine credits.

McMahan hoped that references to The Animated Series in Lower Decks would honor it as the franchise's first animated series, and included several alien species from The Animated Series in the season: a Kzinti ensign, whose species appeared in The Animated Series, is introduced, and in "The Spy Humongous" he mimics the "stooped posture" of the Kzinti seen in that series; Starbase 25 features many different species, including a bartender of the same species as the character Em/3/Green and some bird-like Aurelians which both originated on The Animated Series; and the holodeck instructor Shari Yn Yem in "I, Excretus" is a Pandronian, a species from The Animated Series that has a "distinctive style of dress and speech" and can split themselves into three parts. The season also features the skeleton of "Spock Two", a giant clone of Spock from the Animated Series episode "The Infinite Vulcan". The skeleton appears as part of the collection that is being catalogued in "Kayshon, His Eyes Open", which also includes numerous visual references to many previous Star Trek series.

The season begins with Mariner being interrogated by Cardassians in a holodeck program that is similar to the Next Generation episode "Chain of Command". In "I, Excretus", the crew of the Cerritos participate in holodeck training programs based on previous Starfleet missions that pay homage to the sets and events of episodes from other Star Trek series: "Mirror Universe Encounter" is set in the Mirror Universe and based on the Original Series episode "Mirror, Mirror"; "Old West Planet" has the Western theme of multiple previous episodes but the specific planet design of the Original Series episode "Spectre of the Gun"; "Naked Time" features visual references to both the Original Series episode "The Naked Time" and the Next Generation episode "The Naked Now"; "Medical Ethics" has a similar plot to the Next Generation episode "Ethics"; "The Good of the Many" replicates the set, costumes, and scenario of the scene where Spock has to fix the radioactive warp core in Star Trek II: The Wrath of Khan; "Escape from Spacedock" requires the crew to fly a starship out of a spacedock and save Spock on the Genesis Planet, just like in the plot of Star Trek III: The Search for Spock; and "Borg Encounter" adapts various elements from previous Borg-focused episodes as well as Star Trek: First Contact. Additionally, Dr. T'Ana and Tendi go rock climbing in "wej Duj" on a holodeck simulation of El Capitan in Yosemite National Park, recreating the scene where James T. Kirk does the same in Star Trek V: The Final Frontier (1989).

Rutherford has a vision in "We'll Always Have Tom Paris" of alternate versions of Shaxs wearing different costumes from across the franchise, including a USS Enterprise (NX-01) uniform from Enterprise, a Terran Empire uniform from the Original Series episode "Mirror, Mirror", a Professor Moriarty costume similar to the one seen in the Next Generation episode "Elementary, Dear Data", an Original Series "redshirt" uniform, and as a Borg. In "wej Duj", the crew are seen running through the ship wearing various outfits including Anbo-jyutsu martial arts costumes and gymnastics leotards from the Next Generation episodes "The Icarus Factor" and "The Price", respectively. Also in that episode, Boimler wears the same "Go climb a rock" shirt that Kirk wore in The Final Frontier, and uses the same rocket boots that Spock had in that film's rock climbing scene, while Freeman wears a shirt with "RITOS" on it which is similar to the "DISCO" shirts worn aboard the USS Discovery in Star Trek: Discovery. An alien based on the multi-eyed original design for Saru from Discovery briefly appears on Starbase 25. The evil computer AGIMUS is taken to the Daystrom Institute for Advanced Robotics in "Where Pleasant Fountains Lie". The institute was first seen in Star Trek: Picard, and is shown to look roughly the same during Lower Decks a few decades earlier than that appearance. One of the other evil computers in the institute features the CBS Eye logo as a reference to the series' production company.

Music
Composer Chris Westlake was unable to record his score for the first season with a full orchestra in a traditional recording studio, due to the COVID-19 pandemic, but he was able to with his score for the second season. Recording for the season began by May 2021 at the Sony Scoring Stage in Los Angeles with a live 60-person orchestra. The series' main theme was re-recorded with the full orchestra for the second season. The "Klingon acid punk" records that are featured in the episode "We'll Always Have Tom Paris" have lyrics written by Westlake and translated into the Klingon language by its creator, Mark Okrand. Similar to Boimler being heard humming Jerry Goldsmith's main theme from The Next Generation during the first season, he can be heard humming Goldsmith's main theme from Voyager in "We'll Always Have Tom Paris" after talking about Paris and the crew of the USS Voyager from that series. Selections from Westlake's score for the season were included in the series' Vol. 1 soundtrack, which was released by Lakeshore Records on October 8, 2021.

Marketing
The cast and crew teased the season during a virtual Star Trek Universe panel for New York Comic Con in October 2020. This primarily discussed the first-season finale and was released as an episode of The Ready Room, an aftershow hosted by The Next Generation actor Wil Wheaton. McMahan teased the season later in October during the Virtual Trek Con 2 virtual event. A teaser trailer for the season was released during the "First Contact Day" virtual event on April 5, 2021, celebrating the franchise on the fictional holiday marking first contact between humans and aliens in the Star Trek universe. The season's premiere date was also revealed during the event.

The official trailer was released during Paramount+'s animation panel at the 2021 Comic-Con@Home virtual convention. McMahan and the cast discussed the season. Writing for Digital Spy, Dan Seddon described the trailer as a "wonderfully entertaining 2-minute package [that] has everything from space slugs to evil computers". Scott Collura at IGN said the trailer looked like "more of the same" fun as the first season and had "the usual dose of deep, deep Star Trek references and Easter eggs", while James Whitbrook of Gizmodo said the series was "looking better than ever for round two. And that means more jokes, more delectably silly references to Trek's past, and more earnest Starfleet vibes". Collura and Whitbrook both highlighted the Tom Paris commemorative plate featured in the trailer, which was also released as a physical commemorative plate for purchase. As they did with the first season, animation studio Titmouse released a shirt with a unique design on it alongside each episode. The designs were available for one week each, and fans who bought all ten received a bonus eleventh shirt.

Release

Streaming and broadcast
The season premiered on Paramount+ in the United States on August 12, 2021, and ran for 10 episodes until October 14. Each episode was broadcast in Canada on the same day as the U.S. release by Bell Media on specialty channels CTV Sci-Fi Channel (English) and Z (French) before streaming on Crave. Prime Video has the streaming rights for several territories, including Europe, Australia, New Zealand, Japan, and India. In February 2023, Paramount made a new deal with Prime Video for the series' international streaming rights. This allowed the season to be added to Paramount+ in some other countries in addition to remaining on Prime Video.

Home media
The season was released on DVD and Blu-Ray in the U.S. on July 12, 2022. The release includes over an hour of bonus features, including the animatics for each episode, a round-up of the references and Easter eggs to other Star Trek series in each episode, featurettes about the sound design process and the making of the season in general, and audio commentaries with cast and crew for several of the episodes.

Reception

Critical response
Rotten Tomatoes reported 100% approval with an average rating of 8.30/10 based on 12 reviews.

Accolades

References

External links 
 
 

2
2021 American television seasons